Niki Marangou (1948 – 7 February 2013) was a Greek Cypriot author and artist.

Early life and education
Marangou was born in Limassol, Cyprus, in 1948. She studied sociology in West Berlin, Germany, from 1965 to 1970.

Career
After graduation, Marangou worked as a dramaturge at the Cyprus Theatre Organisation. She also ran a bookshop in Nicosia. She was the author of books of prose, poetry and children’s fairy tales. She was also a painter and had seven solo exhibitions. Her first solo exhibition was in 1975. She was a member of the Hellenic Authors Society and the Cyprus Writers Association.

Some of her books were translated into German and Spanish.

Awards
Marangou received different awards. In 1998, she was awarded the Cavafy prize for poetry in Alexandria. In 2006, she was awarded the poetry prize of the Athens Academy for her book Divan. In 2007 her novel The Demon of Lust was described as one of the ten best Greek short story books by literature magazine Diavaso Rewards. She was given the Konstantin-Kavafis Prize for Poetry in 2008.

Death
Marangou died in Fayoum, Egypt, on 7 February 2013 in a car crash while travelling. She was 65.

Book
Niki Marangou: Von Famagusta nach Wien. Die Geschichte eines Arztes aus Zypern, übers. a. d. Griechischen v. Martin Scharnhorst, 120 S., Klagenfurt, Kitab, 2008

References

1948 births
2013 deaths
Cypriot contemporary artists
Cypriot painters
Cypriot women artists
People from Limassol
Road incident deaths in Egypt
Greek Cypriot poets
20th-century Cypriot women